Tun Tun Aung is one of Myanmar's top professional bodybuilders and a personal trainer and winner of Mr Asia 2016.

At 2017, he won gold medals in Asian Bodybuilding and Fitness Championships from Bhutan. He received 2017 Myanmar Best Athlete Award.

Career

He competed at World Bodybuilding and Physique Sports Championship in 2010. He was placed in the top 5.

In 2017, he was awarded gold medal in Asian Bodybuilding and Fitness Championships from Bhutan. And the next year, he was also awarded silver medal at 10th`World Bodybuilding And Physique Sports Championship in Chiang Mai, Thailand.

At 2019, he grabbed the silver medal with Nhin Nhin Aye at the  Mixed  Pairs  Open  event from Thailand.

Competitive placings

2018 10th`World Bodybuilding And Physique Sports Championship 
2017	Asian Bodybuilding and Fitness Championships	
Mr Asia 2016 (winner)
2016	World Bodybuilding and Physique Sports Championship(4th Runner Up)
2019 Mixed  Pairs  Open  event

References

Burmese bodybuilders
Living people
Professional bodybuilders
People from Yangon
1972 births
Burmese male bodybuilders